Gorla Minore is a comune (municipality) in the Province of Varese in the Italian region Lombardy, located about  northwest of Milan and about  southeast of Varese.

The municipality of Gorla Minore contains the frazione (subdivision) of Prospiano.

Gorla Minore borders the following municipalities: Cislago, Gorla Maggiore, Marnate, Mozzate, Olgiate Olona, Rescaldina, Solbiate Olona.

Between boundaries of Marnate and Olgiate Olona is located a military monument of II World War called Marnate's Bunker.

Demographic evolution

References

External links
 www.comune.gorlaminore.va.it

Cities and towns in Lombardy